Marine Wing Liaison Kadena (MWLK) is a United States Marine Corps logistics and liaison unit based at Kadena Air Base on Okinawa, Japan. They fall under 1st Marine Aircraft Wing and III Marine Expeditionary Force

Mission
Marine Wing Liaison Kadena provides comprehensive operational and logistical support to local and deployed U.S. Marine Corps and United States Navy squadrons operating at Kadena Air Base (KAB) Okinawa, Japan, and facilitates essential liaison with the United States Air Force's 18th Wing and the U.S. Navy's Commander Fleet Activities Okinawa (CFAO), which are located aboard KAB.

History

See also

 United States Marine Corps Aviation
 List of United States Marine Corps aviation support squadrons

References

 MWLK’s official website

Det
United States Armed Forces in Okinawa Prefecture